The 1976 Swedish Grand Prix was a Formula One motor race held at the Scandinavian Raceway in Anderstorp, Sweden on 13 June 1976. It was the seventh round of the 1976 Formula One season and the ninth Swedish Grand Prix. The race was contested over 72 laps of the 4.0 km circuit for a race distance of 290 kilometres.

It saw the first and only win of a six-wheel car – the Tyrrell P34. The theory was that its four front wheels would increase mechanical front-end grip – with more rubber on the road – and thus eliminate understeer while at the same time improve cornering and braking. When it was revealed it was the instant sensation of the 1976 season.

Tyrrell's Jody Scheckter took pole, with Patrick Depailler in fourth. In the race it was Mario Andretti in the Lotus 77 who led for much of the race. Andretti however had been penalised sixty seconds for jumping the start. Andretti's engine failed on lap 46 while attempting to build his lead over the two Tyrrells. They went on to finish first and second, Jody Scheckter leading Patrick Depailler to the line for his second Swedish Grand Prix victory.

Eight laps before Andretti's retirement Chris Amon crashed his Ensign N176 after a suspension failure, allowing championship leader Niki Lauda to move into the position that became third in his Ferrari 312T2. Jacques Laffite continued to show the promise of the Ligier JS5 in fourth. James Hunt was fifth in his McLaren M23 and Clay Regazzoni climbed into the final point in the second Ferrari late in the race.

Classification

Qualifying

*Drivers with a red background failed to qualify.

Race

Championship standings after the race
Points are accurate at the conclusion of the race and do not reflect final results of the 1976 Spanish Grand Prix as it was under appeal.

Drivers' Championship standings

Constructors' Championship standings

Note: Only the top five positions are included for both sets of standings.

References

Swedish Grand Prix
Swedish Grand Prix
Grand Prix
Swedish Grand Prix